Dreamlab is an album by the German band Mythos. It was released in 1975 on the Kosmische Musik label and featured a new line-up of the band.

Similar to the works of several other fellow artists on the same label, the album develops a science fiction concept around the story of an extraterrestrial visitor on a journey to Earth. Dreamlab is predominantly made up of peaceful and relaxed music. The metre is often determined by echoes from flutes and guitar riffs backed by expansive Mellotron arrangements. The song "Expeditions" was used as the soundtrack for the film Die Superspinne.

Track listing
All tracks by Stephan Kaske, Robby Luizaga except where noted.
Side one
 "Dedicated to Wernher von Braun" – 5:53
 "Message part I" – 2:49
 "Message part II" (Kaske) – 5:24
 "Expeditions" – 6:02
Side two
 "Mythalgia" – 2:12
 "Dreamlab" – 11:17
"Echophase" – 3:03
"Quite amazed" – 3:10
"Going to meet my lady" – 5:04
 "Eternity" (Kaske) – 7:07

Personnel
Stephan Kaske – synthesizer, flute, drums, electric guitar, keyboards, acoustic guitar (12 string),vocals
Robby Luizaga – bass, acoustic guitar, mellotron
Hans-Jürgen Pütz – drums (including moog drums), percussion, vibraphone

References

External links
Dreamlab at discogs
Dreamlab at allmusic

Mythos (band) albums
Krautrock albums
1975 albums